Bowsher is a surname. Notable people with the surname include:

Charles Arthur Bowsher (born 1931), American businessman and politician
Dennis Bowsher (born 1983), American modern pentathlete
Jack Bowsher (1930–2006), American race car driver and car owner
Stan Bowsher (1899–1968), Welsh professional footballer

See also
Bosher Club